"Daisy" (Hangul: 데이지; RR: Deiji) is a song recorded by South Korean boy group Pentagon, released on October 12, 2020, by Cube Entertainment as the lead single of the group's tenth extended play WE:TH. The song was written by members Hui and Wooseok, alongside producer Nathan.

"Daisy" was described as a song that contains a sad feeling that everyone would have experienced after a breakup. Lyrically, the song has a dual meaning as the flower language 'daisy' overlaps the meaning of hope, peace, innocence and hopelessness, and the meaning of 'burn in pain and emotion.' Wooseok added saying, "It looks bright but not that bright." The choreography of this song incorporates movements such as making flowers with hands or turning with hands on top of their heads, calling it the 'Sowing Dance' in which daisy seeds are transferred to make flowers.

Ten days after their 4th year anniversary, Pentagon gained their first ever music show win since their debut on SBS MTV's The Show with 8,470 points.

A Chinese and Japanese version of the song was released on October 28, 2020, simultaneously.

Background
The title song, "Daisy" was written after Road to Kingdom. Member Shinwon revealed "At first, Hui hyung played a demo song, and I thought 'it was already good' even before we officially started working on the album. Maybe that's why I waited comfortably. I liked the song. I wasn't worried."

Regarding the keyword 'empathy', Yeo One said, "We are singers, and I think that the job of being a singer is a job of speaking in songs. I wrote the lyrics with the desire to heal the wounds of the listeners and double the joy with the lyrics of the song. You will be able to relate to it." Kino participated in the song's album artwork, choreography and daisy challenge's choreography.

Composition and lyrics

The song is in the key of F major, 85 bpm with a running time of 3:09 minutes. "Daisy" is an alternative rock genre song that was sung with a sad and sad heart that everyone would have experienced after the breakup. The lyrics are expressed by the use of daisy flowers. The white flower as the sign of hope as a metaphor for love and progress focusing on the ambiguous meaning that describes how one will eventually get burned by that love. Pentagon member explained, "After the breakup, I portrayed the feelings wishing that the other person would be happy while wishing they could miss you because they could not meet someone better than me." The track features heartbreaking and realistic sentiments in a straightforward lyrics.

Reception
Choo Seung-Hyun of the Korea Economic Daily wrote that the group "turned 180 degrees into a romantic and lyrical atmosphere compared to their previous songs" and praised the group for trying various genres and various concepts.

Commercial performance
The song debuted at number 111 on South Korea's Gaon Digital Chart with Gaon index of 3,990,191, and number 4 on Gaon Download Chart on the chart issue dated October 11–17, 2020.

Track listing
Download and streaming
 "Daisy" – 3:09

Digital single
 Daisy (Japanese Ver.) – 3:09
 Daisy (Chinese Ver.) – 3:09

Credits and personnel
Credits are adapted from NetEase Music.
 Pentagon – vocals
  Hui – producing, songwriting
  Wooseok – producing, songwriting
 네이슨 (NATHAN) – producing, audio engineer
 yunji – audio engineer
 Shōko Fujibayashi – Japanese lyrics
 Z KING – Chinese lyrics, guide

Live performance
On October 18, 2020, Pentagon performed "Daisy" on KBS Open Concert, and Kang Han-na's Volume Up - Lake Music Festival. On October 19, they performed several songs including "Daisy" on KakaoTV Comeback Show Mu:Talk Live. On October 31, Pentagon performed "Daisy" at Korea Music Drive-In Festival (KMDF 2020).

Promotion
Pentagon kicked off promotions by appearing on Naver Now 5 Minutes to 6, and KBS Cool FM Park Won's Kiss the Radio on October 12. The group appeared on V Live's LieV on October 13. It is their second appearance since "Shine" in 2018. October 17, they held a video call fan signing event with Ktown4u at a studio in Hongdae, Seoul. Hui, Yanan, Yuto and Wooseok appeared as guests on October 18 episode 380 of TVN's Comedy Big League and performed a preview of "Daisy". On October 19, Pentagon was scheduled to perform on KakaoTV Comeback Show Mu:Talk Live and communicate in real time with fans through a live talk session in the KakaoTalk open chat room. The same day, they appeared on U+ Idol Picknic, Gems' Idol Art Museum, and Naver Now Ha Sung-woon's Late Night Idol show. On October 20, the group announced that they partnered up with Richining to hold We:th Taiwan Video Call Fansign Event on November 21. Hui appeared as guest on Naver Now radio show, Jukjae's Late Night Studio Band. On October 21, Pentagon appeared on K-BOB Star, and KT Seezn's Back to the Idol. On October 31 and November 1, Pentagon held Listening Party @Spotify with Universe.

To promote the song, Pentagon launched the hashtag #데이지챌린지 and #Daisy_Challenge on various social media platforms such as TikTok, Twitter and Instagram. Numerous South Korean artists participated in the challenged, including Got7's Yugyeom, Cho Seung-youn, Chungha, Yoo Seon-ho, Angelina Danilova, Kard, and Eric Nam.

On October 17, Cube released 'Pentagon Daisy', a cronut with vanilla custard and raspberry jam fillings which was inspired by the song. The bread is available for a limited time at Cube's bakery, Cubaker in Seongdong-gu, Seoul.

The group promoted the song with a series of live performances on various music programs starting with Mnet's M! Countdown on October 15, followed by performances on KBS's Music Bank, MBC's Show! Music Core, SBS's Inkigayo, SBS MTV's The Show, and MBC Music's Show Champion.

Global platform Makestar prepared a special gift with Pentagon. Makestar opened a one-on-one video call event by selecting 15 winners per member through a lottery from among fans who have purchased the album from the Pentagon's project page from October 26 until October 31.

Music video
An accompanying music video for "Daisy" was uploaded on 1theK and Pentagon's official YouTube channel on October 2, 2020, at 6:00 pm KST. The music video unravels the story of 8 kinds of wound through symbolic visuals and metaphorical images of each member. Pentagon members lying crouched down in a space of different colors and moods, one after another, in a space of different colors and moods, from a space filled with yellow candles and smoke, to a dark night street where rain falls like torrential rain, to a table that has become a mess and a burning bush. It gave a strong impact to those who appeared. When asked about the behind of the shooting, Wooseok saying, "I blew up a car." And then he replied, "There was a scene that fell in the rain outdoors, but it was a time when it was getting cold, so I was filmed while shaking my whole body." Regarding the scene underwater, Kino replied "I have been fond of water since I was a child. After receiving scuba training for filming, I filmed for 5 hours, and I thought I would die." He continued, "During the training, I learn to control water pressure, but I failed once in the middle. If you send a rescue signal, you will come to rescue within 3 seconds, but I couldn't stand 3 seconds. I felt like I was going to die. For the first time in my life, I felt that water was scary. It was so hard, but it was so much fun. But the 5 hour filming underwater was about 1.5 seconds in the music video." The epilogue of the music video follows the separation depicted through vivid colors and vibrant emotions.

The music video surpassed 4 million views in 30 hours after the release. On October 16, the video exceeded 8.51 million views on YouTube.

A lyric video for the song was released on October 15.

A dance practice video for "Daisy" was released on October 16.

A choreography video was released to commemorate the 10 million views on October 19, 5 days after its release.

A performance video was released on November 1.

Accolades

Charts

Weekly charts

Release history

References

External links
 

2020 singles
2020 songs
Pentagon (South Korean band) songs
Cube Entertainment singles
Korean-language songs
Songs written by Hui (singer)
Songs written by Wooseok